The 1960 NCAA Golf Championship was the 22nd annual NCAA-sanctioned golf tournament to determine the individual and team national champions of men's collegiate golf in the United States.

The tournament was held at The Broadmoor in Colorado Springs, Colorado.

Four-time defending champions Houston won the team title, the Cougars' fifth NCAA team national title. 

Houston's Dick Crawford also repeated as individual national champion.

Individual results

Individual champion
 Dick Crawford, Houston

Tournament medalists
 Gene Francis, Purdue (143)

Team results

Note: Top 10 only
DC = Defending champions

References

NCAA Men's Golf Championship
Golf in Colorado
NCAA Golf Championship
NCAA Golf Championship
NCAA Golf Championship